Taliaʻuli Liavaʻa, (born c. 1970) is a Tongan former rugby union player who played as fly-half.

Career
He played for Toloa Old Boys at club level. He also was in the Tonga 1987 Rugby World Cup squad, where he was the youngest member at the age of 17. However, Liava'a did not play any match in the tournament.

References

External links

1970 births
Living people
Tongan rugby union players
Rugby union fly-halves